Caja Rural–Seguros RGA is a UCI ProTeam cycling team sponsored principally by Grupo Caja Rural, a Spanish banking group. The team participates in UCI Europe Tour races and UCI World Tour events when given a wildcard invitation.  The team's administrative offices and management are based in Pamplona, Navarra, Spain, but its service course (workshop and warehouse facility) is in Alsasua, Navarra. It was announced in February 2013 that the team had acquired a co-sponsor in a subsidiary of Caja Rural and would become known as Caja Rural–Seguros RGA from 21 February 2013.

History
Caja Rural re-entered professional cycling in the 2010 season. In late 2009, Caja Rural decided to move back to the professional peloton, forming a UCI Continental Team (competing in the Europe UCI Continental Circuits) that among other things would give continuity to their under 23 and elite amateur teams. In 2010, its first year returning as a professional team, the team's total budget was €837,932. The original squad was made up of 16 riders, of whom 5 had come up from the amateur team. During the season, 4 members of the amateur team turned professional, 3 of them joining Caja Rural and one moving to Movistar.

On October 19, 2010, Juanikorena Iñaki signed a contract with Preventia Sports Club (Club Deportivo Preventia), who manage the Caja Rural professional team, to continue as the team's Directeur Sportif in 2011. However, on 14 December 2010, he announced his departure due to major professional differences over approaches to training ("importantes diferencias en los criterios técnicos-deportivos"). Iñaki was replaced by Mikel Azparren. At the end of January 2011, Iñaki brought a lawsuit against the team in the Civil Court (Juzgado de los Social) of Pamplona, Navarra, Spain. Iñaki proved breach of contract in his suit.  The team's appeal to the Superior Court (Tribunal Superior de Justicia de Navarra) was dismissed on July 25, 2012, and the UCI made full payment of his salary for 2011, drawing from the team's bank guaranty held by the UCI.

In 2011, Caja Rural advanced to the UCI Professional Continental category with a view to competing in top level racing, especially the 2011 Vuelta a España, the first Vuelta in 33 years to visit the Basque Country. On its début as a UCI Professional Continental team, Caja Rural adopted the motto: "un equipo para creer, un equipo para crecer" ("a team to believe in, a team for growth").  The team emphasizes that "growth" in the latter part of this motto is meant to connote not only the growth of the squad, but also the growth of athletes as individuals, in particular amateur athletes making the leap to the professional ranks. In August 2011, Caja Rural rider Fabricio Ferrari won the overall Mountains Classification in the Volta a Portugal and the Young Rider Classification went to Garikoitz "Gari" Bravo. The team did not compete in the 2011 Vuelta a España, but was named the Best Navarro Sports Team in 2011 by the Government of Navarra.

Caja Rural was invited to participate in the 2012 Vuelta a España, which departed from Pamplona where the team is based.  The 2012 Vuelta saw Caja Rural rider Antonio Piedra, take Stage 15, a high mountain affair finishing atop the Lakes of Covadonga climb. Piedra dropped his breakaway companions on the first "Hors Category" climb of the Vuelta, and finished with 2 minutes and 2 seconds advantage over his nearest competitor.  The team's enthusiasm for competition in their Vuelta début was highlighted by a heartbreaking episode in the 4th stage. Marcos García valiantly fought to the head of the peloton, sprinted to the finish line and threw kisses to the crowd as he crossed it triumphantly.  However, owing to miscommunication with the team car, he was unaware that three escapees had crossed the line before him.

These two experienced riders have participated in 25 Grand Tours. After a change of management in the 2012 season and in an effort to retain its UCI World Tour license,  began including more riders from outside the Basque Country who hold high UCI World Tour rankings.

On 21 February 2013, the team's name changed to "Caja Rural-Seguros RGA". Two days later Antonio Piedra took the first podium for the newly renamed team by winning the Mountains Classification in the Vuelta a Murcia, part of the UCI Europe Tour. The first General Classification victory for the newly badged team was won by Francesco Lasca on 31 March 2013 in the Vuelta a La Rioja. Caja Rural–Seguros RGA rider Javier Aramendia won the Overall Combativity Award at the 2013 Vuelta a España after he and his teammates Antonio Piedra, David Arroyo and Fabricio Ferrari took 7 of the 20 stage Combativity Awards given during the race.

Sponsorship
The professional team's principal sponsor is Grupo Caja Rural, a savings bank and agricultural credit cooperative in Spain with 3,600 branches.

On 21 February 2013, Caja Rural added a new co-sponsor Seguros RGA. Seguros RGA (meaning "Insurance RGA") was founded on 17 March 1986 as the insurance subsidiary of Grupo Caja Rural. The "Seguros RGA" name and logo were added to new team jerseys and all other media.  Seguros RGA had supported the team in its bid to compete in the 2012 Vuelta a España and was featured on Vuelta team jerseys.  Seguros RGA was so impressed with the profile and performance of the team that they decided to step forward as a team co-sponsor.

Škoda Auto provides sponsorship and team cars.  Euskorot, a Basque Country graphics company, supplies the team car livery.

Team bikes for the 2015 and 2016 seasons are supplied by Fuji Bikes models Transonic, Altamira and Norcom Straight. From the 2012 to the 2014 season, the team had ridden Bulgarian brand bicycles ViVELO.

From the 2015 season, team kit is supplied by Italian clothing brand ALÉ, replacing Inverse–CIRO SPORT from the previous several seasons. Spiuk supplies the team's helmets and glasses.

From the 2016 season, the powermeters and computers are supplied by Pioneer replacing Rotor

Bed4u Hotels added its sponsorship in January 2013 offering the team lodging.   Bed4u replaced Playitas, a Canary Islands sports resort where the team trained in the winter of 2012, on team jerseys.

Centro Médico Vitasport (Vitasport Medical Centre), an advanced technology athletic training centre for professional and amateur athletes is a sponsor and also the registered office of Club Deportivo Preventia, the organization that runs the team.

Team roster

Major wins

National champions
2012
 Bulgarian Road Race, Danail Petrov
 Portuguese Road Race Championships, Manuel Antonio Cardoso
2013
 Bulgarian Road Race, Danail Petrov
2019
 European Track (Scratch race), Sebastian Mora
2022
 Venezuelan Time Trial, Orluis Aular
 Venezuelan Road Race, Orluis Aular

References

External links

  

UCI Professional Continental teams
Cycling teams based in Spain
Cycling teams established in 2010
2010 establishments in Spain